Carousel is a Latvian band that represented their country in the Eurovision Song Contest 2019 in Tel Aviv. The band was originally a duo consisting of founding members Sabīne Žuga and Mārcis Vasiļevskis. Staņislavs  Judins (double bass) and Mareks Logins (drums) joined Carousel in 2019.

They were selected to represent Latvia in the 2019 contest after winning the country's national selection, Supernova. They performed their entry, "That Night", in the first half of the second semi-final in Tel Aviv, but failed to qualify from the semi-final.

Discography

Extended plays

Singles

References

Eurovision Song Contest entrants of 2019
Eurovision Song Contest entrants for Latvia
Latvian musical groups